Bozarmut is a town in Yatağan district of Muğla Province, Turkey.

Bozarmut (literally "blemished pear" in Turkish) may refer to the following places in Turkey:

 Bozarmut, Bolu, a village in the district of Bolu, Bolu Province
 Bozarmut, Kargı
 Bozarmut, Taşköprü, a village

See also
 Bozcaarmut (disambiguation)